Task systems are mathematical objects used to model the set of possible configuration of online algorithms. They were introduced by Borodin, Linial and Saks (1992) to model a variety of online problems. A task system determines a set of states and costs to change states. Task systems obtain as input a sequence of requests such that each request assigns processing times to the states. The objective of an online algorithm for task systems is to create a schedule that minimizes the overall cost incurred due to processing the tasks with respect to the states and due to the cost to change states.

If the cost function to change states is a metric, the task system is a metrical task system (MTS). This is the most common type of task systems.
Metrical task systems generalize online problems such as paging, list accessing, and the k-server problem (in finite spaces).

Formal Definition
If  is a metric,  is a metrical task system. An input to the task system is a sequence  such that for each ,  is a vector of  non-negative entries that determine the processing costs for the  states when processing the th task.

An algorithm for the task system produces a schedule  that determines the sequence of states. For instance,  means that the th task  is run in state . The processing cost of a schedule is

The objective of the algorithm is to find a schedule such that the cost is minimized.

Known Results
As usual for online problems, the most common measure to analyze algorithms for metrical task systems is the competitive analysis, where the performance of an online algorithm is compared to the performance of an optimal offline algorithm. For deterministic online algorithms, there is a tight bound  on the competitive ratio due to Borodin et al. (1992).

The lower bound is due to Bartal et al. (2006,2005). The upper bound is due to Bubeck, Cohen, Lee and Lee (2018) who improved upon a result of Fiat and Mendel (2003).

There are many results for various types of restricted metrics.

See also
 Adversary model
 Competitive analysis
 K-server problem
 Online algorithm
 Page replacement algorithm
 Real-time computing

References
 

 

 
 

 

 

Online algorithms